Chuttalabbayi is an Indian Telugu language film released on 26 February 1988 starring Krishna, Radha and Suhasini in the lead roles. K. Chakravarthy scored and composed the film's soundtrack album. Directed by Kodi Ramakrishna and produced by N. Ramalingeswara Rao for Ramprasad Art Movies, the film ended up as a commercially safe venture.

Cast 
 Krishna
 Radha
 Suhasini
 Nutan Prasad
 Prasad Babu
 Giribabu
 S. Varalakshmi
 Gollapudi Maruti Rao
 Nirmalamma
 Y. Vijaya
 Kalpana Rai

Soundtrack 
K. Chakravarthy scored and composed the film's soundtrack.
 "Suvvi Suvvi" — S. P. B., S. Janaki
 "Dashing Veerude" — Raj Sitaram
 "Thaagi Mari" — S. P. B.,
 "Edo Vunnadi" — S. P. B., S. Janaki
 "Aate Sundhama" — Mano, K. S. Chitra, P. Susheela
 "Ontarigunte" — S. P. B., S. Janaki

References

External links 

1980s Telugu-language films
1988 films
Indian action films
1980s masala films
Films directed by Kodi Ramakrishna
Films scored by K. Chakravarthy
1988 action films